Arawum is a nearly extinct Rai Coast language spoken in Madang Province, Papua New Guinea.

References

External links
Rosetta Project: Arawum Swadesh list

Rai Coast languages
Languages of Madang Province
Endangered Papuan languages
Severely endangered languages